The women's 4 × 6 km relay competition at the Biathlon World Championships 2023 was held on 18 February 2023.

Results
The race was started at 15:00.

References

Women's relay